Ferno is a comune (municipality) in the Province of Varese in the Italian region Lombardy, located about  northwest of Milan and about  south of Varese.

The municipality of Ferno contains the frazione (subdivision) San Macario.

Ferno borders the following municipalities: Lonate Pozzolo, Samarate, Somma Lombardo, Vizzola Ticino. It is served by Ferno-Lonate Pozzolo railway station.

Volare Group SpA once had its head office in Area Tecnica Sud of Terminal 1 of Milan Malpensa Airport in Ferno.

Architecture and Monuments

Civil Architectures

Saint Mary's Church
The church of Saint Mary is the oldest building of the village, and it is characterized by the romantic style of the XIV century.  Several frescoes of the medieval era are present as well as a triptych of a disciple of Gaudenzio Ferrari.

Demographic evolution

References

External links

 www.comune.ferno.va.it 

Cities and towns in Lombardy